Pliszka  (German Pleiskehammer) is a settlement in the administrative district of Gmina Bytnica, within Krosno Odrzańskie County, Lubusz Voivodeship, in western Poland. 

The settlement has a population of 30.

References

Pliszka